Sigurgeir Gíslason (17 June 1925 – 9 April 2003) was an Icelandic chess player.

Biography
In the 1950s Sigurgeir Gíslason was one of the leading Icelandic chess players. He played mainly in domestic chess tournaments and Icelandic Chess Championships.

Sigurgeir Gíslason played for Iceland in the Chess Olympiads:
 In 1952, at first reserve board in the 10th Chess Olympiad in Helsinki (+2, =2, -2),
 In 1956, at first reserve board in the 12th Chess Olympiad in Moscow (+1, =1, -4).

References

External links

Sigurgeir Gíslason chess games at 365chess.com

1925 births
2003 deaths
Icelandic chess players
Chess Olympiad competitors
20th-century chess players